The 2005 A3 Champions Cup was third edition of A3 Champions Cup. It was held from February 13 to 19, 2003 in Seogwipo, South Korea.

Participants
 Suwon Samsung Bluewings – 2004 K-League Champions
 Pohang Steelers – 2004 K-League Runners-up
 Shenzhen Jianlibao – 2004 Chinese Super League Champions
 Yokohama F. Marinos – 2004 J. League Champions

Group table

Match results
All times are Korea Standard Time (KST) – UTC+9

Awards

Winners

Individual Awards

Goalscorers

External links
2005 A3 Champions Cup in RSSSF.com

A3 Champions Cup
International club association football competitions hosted by South Korea
A3
A3